= Tadas Burgaila (activist) =

- Born: February 27, 1990 (age 36); Lithuania
- Occupations: Entrepreneur, startup founder, investor
- Known for: Co-founder and chairman of the board of Kilo Health

Tadas Burgaila (born 27 February 1990) is a Lithuanian entrepreneur, startup founder, and investor. He is best known as co-founder and chairman of the board of Kilo Health (now Kilo), a company supporting the development of startups across longevity, wellness, beauty, travel, and personal development. He is also the founder of the investment platform Lost Astronaut and a co-founder of Unicorns Lithuania, the country's startup association.

== Biography ==
Burgaila was born on 27 February 1990 in Lithuania. He began his entrepreneurial activities at a young age and built his first product, an international screensaver website ranked. At 18, he found himself in debt and faced bailiffs.

In 2013, Burgaila co-founded Kilo Health (now Kilo), a digital health company developing subscription-based health, wellness, nutrition, travel, and personal development products. The company was ranked as the second-fastest-growing company in Europe in the Financial Times FT1000 (2022) and Deloitte Technology Fast 50 (2021) lists. In 2025, Kilo reported consolidated revenues exceeding €500 million, with operations across North America, Europe, and Oceania. The company's products are used by more than 10 million users globally.

In 2024, the magazine TOP ranked him 51st on its list of the richest people in the country.

In 2025, Burgaila co-founded Lost Astronaut, an early-stage venture studio and investment platform focusing on venture building, venture capital, and talent development. The organization invests in early-stage startups, with typical ticket sizes ranging from approximately $25,000 to $250,000. As of 2025, Lost Astronaut had developed more than 20 in-house startup concepts and completed over 40 early-stage investments across seven countries.

In November, Burgaila became the main shareholder of the football club FK Žalgiris Vilnius, Lithuania's oldest football club.

In January 2026, he was awarded the "Brightest Voice of the Ecosystem" at the Vilnius TechFusion Awards 2025.

== Public activity ==
Burgaila is a co-founder of Unicorns Lithuania, the Lithuanian startup association representing more than 130 technology companies. Through the organization, he has participated in development initiatives, policy advocacy, and the international promotion of Lithuania's startup sector. As a public investor, Burgaila serves as a judge on Shark Tank Lithuania, where he evaluates startup pitches and invests in selected early-stage companies.

Since 2026, he is one of the originators of MVP (Moksleivių Vienaragių Paieška), an entrepreneurship education initiative for supporting younger founders.

== See also ==
- FK Žalgiris Vilnius
